Jahmar Neville Hamilton (born 22 September 1990) is an Anguillan cricketer. He plays as wicket-keeper and is part of the Leeward Islands cricket team. He made his international debut for the West Indies cricket team in August 2019.

Domestic career
He made his Twenty20 debut for the Anguilla cricket team against Grenada at the 2007/08 Stanford 20/20 Tournament in Antigua., and his first class debut for the Leeward Islands in February 2008 against Barbados.

In 2013, Hamilton was included in the Antigua Hawksbills squad for the inaugural season of the Twenty20 Caribbean Premier League.

He was the top run-scorer for the Leeward Islands in the 2016-17 Regional Four Day Competition, and the only player in the team to score multiple centuries in the tournament.

International career
In May 2018, he was named in the West Indies' Test squad for their series against Sri Lanka, but he did not play. In August 2018, he was included in the West Indies' Test squad for the series against India, and again he did not play. In November 2018, he was once again named in the West Indies' Test side, this time for the series against Bangladesh. In August 2019, Hamilton was added to the West Indies' Test squad for the second Test against India, replacing Shane Dowrich, who had an ankle injury. He made his Test debut for the West Indies, against India, on 30 August 2019.

In December 2020, Hamilton was named in the West Indies' One Day International (ODI) squad for their series against Bangladesh. He made his ODI debut for the West Indies, against Bangladesh, on 25 January 2021.

Football career
Hamilton also played football, representing his country during 2007 CONCACAF U17 Tournament qualification.

References

1990 births
Living people
West Indies Test cricketers
West Indies One Day International cricketers
Leeward Islands cricketers
Anguillan cricketers
Antigua Hawksbills cricketers
Anguillan footballers
Anguilla youth international footballers
Wicket-keepers
Association footballers not categorized by position